A lamentation, or lament, is a song, poem, or piece of music expressing grief, regret, or mourning.

Lamentation may also refer to:

 Lamentation (Pietà), a painting by Petrus Christus, c. 1444
 Lamentation (The Mourning of Christ), a painting by Giotto in the 14th Century.
 Lamentation (ballet), a 1930 ballet by Martha Graham
 "Lamentation" (Millennium), an episode of Millennium
 Lamentation (novel), a historical mystery novel by C. J. Sansom
 Lamentation, a 2009 fantasy novel by Ken Scholes
 Lamentation Mountain, a mountain near Meriden, Connecticut, U.S.
 Lamentation Mountain State Park

See also 
 Lamentation of Christ, a common subject in Christian art
 Book of Lamentations, a poetic book of the Hebrew Bible 
 The Lamentations of a Sinner, by Catherine Parr, the sixth wife of King Henry VIII of England 
 Lamentations (disambiguation)
 Lament (disambiguation)